Ander Martín Odriozola (born 16 November 2000) is a Spanish professional footballer who plays as a right winger for Real Sociedad B.

Club career
Martín was born in San Sebastián, Gipuzkoa, Basque Country, and joined Real Sociedad's youth setup in 2018, from Antiguoko. He made his senior debut with the C-team on 25 August 2019, starting and scoring the opener in a 1–1 Tercera División home draw against Club Portugalete.

Martín first appeared with the reserves on 16 February 2020, playing the full 90 minutes in a 2–4 home loss against Barakaldo CF in the Segunda División B championship. He renewed his contract until 2023 on 1 July, and featured in 18 matches during the campaign as the B-side returned to Segunda División after 59 years.

Martín made his professional debut on 4 September 2021, coming on as a second-half substitute for Naïs Djouahra in a 0–1 away loss against FC Cartagena. He first appeared with the main squad the following 17 February, replacing fellow youth graduate Mikel Oyarzabal late into a 2–2 UEFA Europa League away draw against RB Leipzig.

Martín made his La Liga debut on 20 February 2022, replacing Portu in a 0–4 Basque derby loss to Athletic Bilbao.

References

External links

2000 births
Living people
Footballers from San Sebastián
Spanish footballers
Association football wingers
La Liga players
Segunda División players
Segunda División B players
Tercera División players
Antiguoko players
Real Sociedad C footballers
Real Sociedad B footballers
Real Sociedad footballers